This is a list of folk song collections including pioneer and notable work in collecting folk songs.

Many such collections were made in the 19th century. The earlier ones are often considered to be parts of the National Romanticist interests in folklore. The monumental efforts of single enthusiasts laid the foundation for the modern academic investigations of epic folk songs. The comments made by various collectors also indicate that they respected and were inspired by the work done by their counterparts. Child's comments show that he indeed could read and understand ballads in Scandinavian languages.

The following table lists comparable pioneering works from different countries or language areas, and corresponding modern scholarly collections or classifications. The 'pioneers' are not necessarily the first collectors, but they were each the first to gain widespread recognition, and to provide classification or at least useful enumeration.

See also

 Roud Folk Song Index
The Types of the Scandinavian Medieval Ballad

Bibliography
Marcello Sorce Keller, "The Problem of Classification in Folksong Research: a Short History", Folklore, XCV (1984), no. 1, 100-104.

External links

Chansons nationales et populaires de France digitized book
Canti popolari del Piemonte digitized book
Canti popolari siciliani digitized book
Norske mellomalderballadar digital edition
Roud Folk Song Index

Song